The following is a list of state routes in Nevada longer than  in length that have been removed from the Nevada state highway system since 1976. Several of these highways were reorganized into the state system of frontage roads.


List of highways

State Route 142

State Route 144 

State Route 144 (SR 144) in Mesquite was also designated as Interstate 15 Business. It was removed as of December 31, 2005. It covered Mesquite Boulevard and Sandhill Boulevard in Mesquite. The State Route designation was applied to the portion of Mesquite Boulevard from its southern crossing of Interstate 15 to Sandhill Boulevard, then along Sandhill Boulevard to its northern crossing of Interstate 15.

Route 144, from SR 170 to Hillside Drive, was once US 91, which used to stretch from Sweetgrass, Montana to Long Beach, California.

State Route 153

State Route 162

State Route 166 

State Route 166 was a Nevada state highway that was signed along Lakeshore Road in Clark County. The road still runs along the west shore of Lake Mead, but is no longer a state highway. SR 166 started at an intersection with US 93 near Boulder City inside the Lake Mead National Recreation Area. The highway went north along Lake Mead's shore. It quickly encountered a toll booth where motorists paid to enter the recreation area. Several roads branched off SR 166 and lead to marinas. Near the end of its route, the highway turned west before meeting its northern terminus, at an intersection with SR 564/SR 147.

Signage for the route was removed by 2000, and according to a park ranger, the route is a park service road, and the signs were only put up to "make it easier for tourists."

State Route 167 

State Route 167 was a Nevada state highway that was signed along Northshore Road in Clark County. The road still runs along the west shore of Lake Mead, but it is no longer a state highway. SR 167 started at SR 147 inside the Lake Mead National Recreation Area. The road went east along Lake Mead's shore. It eventually turned north near Echo Bay. A road branched SR 167 and led to Echo Bay Airport, and another road led to Overton Beach on Lake Mead. The road turned west and quickly reached its northeastern terminus at SR 169.

State Route 291 

State Route 291 (SR 291) was a two-lane state highway in Humboldt County. It served a sparsely populated section of the state, connecting northwestern Nevada to southern Oregon. Most of the highway was originally part of SR 8A, and was later improved through an effort to provide an all-weather highway linking northern Nevada to the Pacific Northwest.

When Nevada officials began the process of renumbering the state's highways in 1976, SR 140 was planned to be redesignated as State Route 291. The proposed route number was first seen on the 1978 version of the state's highway map. Once the renumbering process was finished in the early 1980s, however, the highway retained the SR 140 designation it has today. The route has remained relatively unchanged since.

State Route 378 

State Route 378 (SR 378) was a  state highway in Nye County. It connected the community of Round Mountain to SR 376. The highway originated as State Route 70 in 1941 and was later renumbered to State Route 92 before becoming SR 378 in 1976. The route was removed from the state highway system by 1999 to make way for an expansion of the adjacent Round Mountain Gold Mine.

State Route 378 began at a junction with SR 376 in the Big Smoky Valley of northwestern Nye County. From here, the road ran in an easterly direction towards Round Mountain.

An unimproved road resembling the modern highway alignment first appears on state maps in 1941, connecting the community of Round Mountain to SR 8A (now SR 376). This road was designated as SR 70 the following year.  By 1946, pavement had been placed along the route.

By 1965, the SR 70 designation was removed from the highway and replaced with SR 92, potentially to align the 70 designation to a road that met with California's State Route 70.

In the 1976 renumbering of Nevada's state routes, the recently designated SR 92 was dropped in favor of State Route 378. This numbering change was first seen on state highway maps in 1978.  SR 378 remained unchanged on official maps until 1999, when the route number and road itself was removed from the state highway map. A new road to Round Mountain reappeared on the next version of the map, albeit realigned and without a route number. The original highway alignment was enveloped by the expansion of the Round Mountain Gold Mine.

State Route 428 

State Route 428 (SR 428) is a former highway in Washoe County. It followed Eastlake Boulevard through New Washoe City and along the east side of Washoe Lake, providing access to Washoe Lake State Park. The road was formerly known as State Route 3B.

State Route 428 began at US 395, near the present-day Eastlake Boulevard interchange just north of Carson City. From there, the highway curved north to follow the eastern shores of Washoe Lake. Near the northeast corner of the lake, the road diverged north to head towards New Washoe City. Outside of the town, SR 428 terminated at another junction on US 395 between Washoe City and Pleasant Valley.

Eastlake Boulevard first appears on state highway maps in 1942 as State Route 3B, an unimproved road branching from State Route 3 (now US 395 Alt) at both ends. The highway had been completely paved by 1969.  The route underwent no significant other changes until it was renumbered as State Route 428 in the 1978 statewide highway renumbering.

State Route 428 disappeared from state highway maps by 1983. However, the southern  of the highway, near the Interstate 580/US 395 interchange, are still maintained by NDOT as a frontage road (FR WA45).

State Route 429 

State Route 429 (SR 429) was a rural state highway located in southern Washoe County. It followed Bowers Mansion Road, a former alignment of US 395. The SR 429 designation was retired in 2012, and the route has since become part of US 395 Alt. SR 429 began at Hobart Road, near the Carson City – Washoe County line immediately adjacent to present-day Interstate 580 (I-580) and US 395. The highway continued northward past Bowers Mansion State Park before turning east to terminate at US 395 just south of Washoe City.

State Route 442

State Route 485 

State Route 485 (SR 485) was a state highway in White Pine County. It provided access to the town of Ruth. The roadway was turned over to local control in the 1980s.

The road's pavement ends slightly west of Ruth, although a dirt road continues back near the former site of Riepetown.

The road to Ruth was established as State Route 44 by 1935. At that time, the route was shown on official state maps as being a paved road connecting the former town of Kimberly to US 50 via Ruth. By 1941, SR 44 appears to have been altered and then comprised two roadways, a  road to Ruth and a  spur to Kimberly;. a routing which was defined by state highway law. Although maps are unclear, it appears the road to Ruth was eliminated prior to 1964, and the spur to Kimberly was retained as SR 44. The town of Ruth may have been relocated along the highway as well, in concordance with open pit mining operations in the area.

SR 44 remained unchanged for many years, until the 1976 renumbering of Nevada's state highways. In that process, SR 44 was to be replaced by SR 485.  However, the new designation was not retained through the state's renumbering process; SR 485 last appeared on the 1980–1981 state highway map while the numbering transition was still underway.

State Route 486 

State Route 486 (SR 486) was a state highway in White Pine County. The roadway was turned over to local control in the 1990s. Immediately before the route number was retired, the SR 486 designation encompassed Duck Creek Road, which started at the south end of pavement in the middle of Duck Creek Valley. It went north down the valley, then turned west and exited at Gallagher Gap, following the course of Duck Creek. Once through the gap, it continued west until it intersected US 93, where it ended.

The road extending east from US 93 to Duck Creek Valley (Duck Creek Road), south over Success Summit to Cave Lake State Park (Success Summit Road), and back west to US 6/US 50/US 93 (Steptoe Creek Road) appeared on state maps before the 1976 renumbering of Nevada's state routes, but had no state designation. The designation of SR 486 was first seen on state highway maps in 1978 and included the entire loop (known as Success Loop), but was scaled back to the paved northern portion by 1982. SR 486 remained unchanged on official maps until 1995, when the route number was removed from the state highway map. The entire loop is now part of White Pine County Route 29, though some agencies, including the Nevada Division of State Parks and Humboldt-Toiyabe National Forest, still refer to part or all of the road as SR 486.

State Route 489 

State Route 489 (SR 489) was a state highway that connected the near ghost town of Cherry Creek to US 93 in White Pine County. The roadway was turned over to local control in the 1990s.The SR 489 designation started at US 93. It went west across Steptoe Valley and ended at the end of pavement in Cherry Creek, which is now almost deserted but was once a thriving town because of silver and gold located in the area. Cherry Creek Road continues west, however the section west of Cherry Creek has never had a state route number.

Before the 1976 renumbering of Nevada's state routes, the road from US 93 to Cherry Creek was designated SR 35. The change to SR 489 was first seen on state highway maps in 1978. SR 489 remained unchanged on official maps until 1993, when the route number was removed from the state highway map. Both the paved and unpaved sections of Cherry Creek Road are now part of White Pine County Route 21.

State Route 500 

State Route 500 (SR 500) was a state highway located in Boulder City. It ran for about  along the original route of US 93 and historical US 466 on the Nevada Highway (former State Route 26) through the middle of town. It came into being when the US 93 designation was moved to a new "truck bypass" alignment along the upper reaches of Hemenway Wash in 1982. After being turned over to local control by NDOT, the street was renamed as Nevada Way by the city.

State Route 501 

State Route 501 was a state highway in Boulder City. It ran from US 93 to State Route 500 near City Hall in Boulder City via Adams Boulevard and Utah Street. The route was turned over to local control in the 2000s.

State Route 512 

State Route 512 (SR 512) was a state highway in Carson City, Nevada. It connected Kings Canyon west of Carson City to the state capitol using various city streets. The route dates to the mid-19th century, as part of a wagon trail linking Lake Tahoe and Carson City that was later incorporated into the Lincoln Highway. SR 512 was turned over to local control in 2010.

State Route 513 

State Route 513 (SR 513) was a short state highway in Carson City, Nevada. The route was originally part of State Route 65, a longer highway that served the eastern outskirts of the city. SR 513 was turned over to Carson City in phases, and completely removed from the state highway system in 2011.

State Route 513 began at the intersection of Fifth Street and South Carson Street (US 395 Business/SR 529) in downtown Carson City. At the northeast corner of this intersection is south end of the Nevada capitol complex. SR 513 headed east along East Fifth Street, passing by the Nevada Legislature building and other state facilities. Crossing Roop Street, the route entered a more residential area of the central city. After about a mile (1.6 km), SR 513 became a two-lane road through more open areas. Fifth Street then rises over the Carson City Freeway (US 50 and 395) and touches down next to Nevada State Prison. In 2011, the state highway ended at a roundabout intersection with Fairview Drive just past the prison facility.

State Route 516 

State Route 516 (SR 516) was a state highway following Ormsby Boulevard and Winnie Lane in Carson City, Nevada. The route was turned over to local control in 2010.

The highway began at the intersection of Ormsby Boulevard and West King Street (SR 512) in a residential area of western Carson City. From there, the route went north on Ormsby Boulevard through residential areas and fields before curving west. After approximately one mile (1.6 km), the route intersected Winnie Lane. SR 516 followed Winnie Lane north and east from this intersection, passing about  through more neighborhoods before ending at North Carson Street (US 395 Business/SR 529).

State Route 516 was designated a state highway in 1983. This change was seen on the state highway map in 1982.

A transfer of ownership of several state highways to Carson City's control was proposed by 2007. The shift in ownership, which included SR 516, was proposed in order to reduce the amount of money the city was supposed to pay to the Nevada Department of Transportation for the construction of the Carson City Freeway (future Interstate 580). State Route 516 was removed from the state highway system by January 2010.

State Route 518 

State Route 518 (SR 518) was a short state highway in Carson City, Nevada serving the state's Stewart Complex. The route originated as State Route 36. It was removed from the state highway system in 2018.

State Route 520 

State Route 520 (SR 520) was a short state highway in Carson City, Nevada. The route served the central portion of the city, providing access to several government buildings in the capitol district. It was turned over to local control in 2010.

State Route 525 

State Route 525 (SR 525) was a short state highway in Carson City, Nevada. It covered a portion of College Parkway and all of Airport Road in the northern part of the city. Originally designated in 1976, it was turned over to local control in 2011.

State Route 529 

State Route 529 (SR 529) was a state highway designation that existed concurrently with US 395 Bus. and was the state route designation of the section of the route. At their meeting on November 14, 2018, NDOT's Board of Directors voted to transfer ownership of the remainder of SR 529 (between I-580 and Fairview Drive) to Carson City, in order to facilitate the city's goal to construct a complete streets project on South Carson Street.

State Route 530 

State Route 530 (SR 530) was a  state highway in Carson City. It followed a portion of William Street and was formerly signed as part of US 50 (and US 395 temporarily). The route was turned over to local control in 2010.

State Route 531 

State Route 531 (SR 531) was a state highway in Carson City, Nevada. It followed a portion of College Parkway in the northern part of the city. Created by 1995, the highway was turned over to city control in 2011.

State Route 587

State Route 589 

State Route 589 (SR 589) comprised a large portion of Sahara Avenue, a major east–west section line road in the Las Vegas Valley. The road is named after the Sahara Hotel and Casino which is located on Las Vegas Boulevard where it intersects with Sahara Avenue.

State Route 601 

State Route 601 was a state highway in the U.S. state of Nevada, running along Main Street in Las Vegas. Its last section was turned over to the city in 2005. SR 601 ran along the full length of Main Street; both ends were at State Route 604 (Las Vegas Boulevard).

State Route 605 

State Route 605 was a north–south state highway in the Las Vegas urban area. SR 605 comprised a portion of Paradise Road. The route was turned over to local control in 2001. SR 605 began at Tropicana Avenue (SR 593). From there, it followed Paradise Road north to its terminus at Sahara Avenue (SR 589). The portion of Paradise Road from Harmon Avenue (near the Hard Rock Hotel and Casino) south to Tropicana Avenue was a multi-lane one-way street southbound.

Paradise Road is considered the main entrance to McCarran International Airport. The northern leg of the Las Vegas Monorail runs down the center of the road for a portion of the route and then along the eastern side to the monorail's northern terminus. RTC Transit Route 108 functions on this road.

Notable attractions on Paradise include:
McCarran International Airport
 Hard Rock Hotel and Casino
 Silver Sevens Hotel and Casino
 Las Vegas Convention Center
 Westgate Las Vegas
 SLS Las Vegas
 Las Vegas Monorail

State Route 605 was relinquished to local control in 2001.

State Route 606

State Route 607 

State Route 607 (SR 607) was a state highway serving the Las Vegas Valley including Las Vegas, Nevada and North Las Vegas. The highway followed Eastern Avenue, a section line arterial in Las Vegas and continued on Civic Center Drive in North Las Vegas. The route was turned over to local control by 2008.

State Route 607 began at Sahara Avenue (SR 589) at the Las Vegas city limit. It followed Eastern Avenue northward towards Owens Avenue, where the roadway entered the City of North Las Vegas and changed names to Civic Center Drive. SR 607 continued north to pass through downtown North Las Vegas before terminating at Cheyenne Avenue (SR 574). RTC Transit Route 110 functions on this road.

North of the "Five Points" intersections with Charleston Boulevard (SR 159) and Fremont Street (SR 582), SR 607 shifted slightly eastward to run over the former 25th Street alignment as it headed towards North Las Vegas. By January 2008, the route had been completely relinquished to local control.

State Route 650 

State Route 650 (SR 650) was a state highway in Washoe County, Nevada. The route followed McCarran Boulevard, an arterial ring road serving the cities of Reno and Sparks. The route provided access to many businesses and residential areas in the Truckee Meadows. McCarran Boulevard was gradually constructed through the Reno/Sparks area over a period of several years. The portion east of US 395 was previously designated as SR 650 while the western half was designated SR 651; the two highway numbers were merged into a new SR 659 in 2009.

McCarran Boulevard was named after the late Senator Pat McCarran, a member of the Democratic Party who contributed to the development of aviation both in Las Vegas and on a national scale and was staunchly anti communist.

State Route 651 

State Route 651 (SR 651) was a state highway in Washoe County, Nevada. The route followed McCarran Boulevard, an arterial ring road serving the cities of Reno and Sparks. The route provided access to many businesses and residential areas in the Truckee Meadows. McCarran Boulevard was gradually constructed through the Reno/Sparks area over a period of several years. The portion east of US 395 was previously designated as SR 650 while the western half was designated SR 651; the two highway numbers were merged into a new SR 659 in 2009.

McCarran Boulevard was named after the late Senator Pat McCarran, a member of the Democratic Party who contributed to the development of aviation both in Las Vegas and on a national scale and was staunchly anti communist.

State Route 663 

State Route 663 (SR 663) was an east–west state highway in Washoe County, Nevada serving the Reno-Sparks area. The route was turned over to local control in 2010.

Oddie Boulevard was named after former Republican Senator Tasker Oddie.

State Route 666

State Route 706

State Route 758

State Route 765 

State Route 765 (SR 765) was the state highway designation for 6th Street (old US 40) in Wells, Nevada, United States until November 30, 1995, when it was given to the city.

State Route 780 

State Route 780 (SR 780) was a state highway in Eureka County, Nevada. SR 780 ran from the Richmond–Eureka Mine east to US 50 in Eureka. It was turned over to local control in 2012.

SR 780 was designated on July 1, 1976.  SR 780 was removed from the state highway system and transferred to Eureka County control on January 9, 2012, although the Nevada Department of Transportation will continue to upgrade pavement markings on the old route through 2022.

State Route 786

State Route 790

See also

References 

Former